Sohar University (جامعة صحار ) was established in 2001 as the first private university in Oman. It was granted degree awarding powers by the Oman Ministry of Higher Education, with the authority to provide programs and courses whose successful completion leads to academic awards.

Summary 
Sohar University has obtained official approval from the Ministry of Higher Education, following the issuance of the Ministry Decision No. 47/2001 dated 11/9/2001, to commence the first private university in the Sultanate of Oman. It originally started under the name of Sohar College of Applied Sciences, until formally approved as a university in a ceremony under the patronage of His Highness Sayed Asaad bin Toriq.

Tagline 
Sohar University is the second University in Oman, offers undergraduate and postgraduate programs. It has a world class campus located in Sohar. 

جامعة صحار هي الجامعة الثانية في سلطنة عمان، وتقدم برامج البكالوريوس والدراسات العليا. لديها حرم جامعي عالمي المستوى في ولاية صحار

About Sohar University

Faculties and Departments

Services

Research and Innovation
We are committed to the increased development of research and knowledge transfer during the coming five years that meets international standards. We believe that higher education and the student experience are enhanced by delivery in an environment where the academic staff is engaged with research, innovation, and knowledge transfer. The creation of new knowledge allows us to shape our future and provides opportunities for wealth generation and enhancement of the quality of life.

History
Sohar University effectively began its life as the Sohar College for Applied Sciences, which opened in 1998. At that time, the college's main overseas partner was the University of Lincolnshire & Humberside (UK). In 2001, Sohar University became affiliated to the University of Queensland (Australia), a member of Universitas 21, to ensure that its academic activities met international standards.

Academic
The medium of instruction is English for most programs, but some courses in the Faculty of Education and Arts are delivered in Arabic.  Nearly all students spend one year in the General Foundations Program (GFP) to improve their English, math and computer literacy skills prior to entering a degree program offered through the faculties of: Business, Computing and Information Technology, Engineering, Education & art, English & Language studies. Law students are exempted from studying English at the GFP.

Campus Expansion
The University campus is located in Sohar, Oman's fastest growing city and the administrative centre of Al Batinah region in the Sultanate of Oman. The University lies on the coast of the Gulf of Oman, 224 kilometres west of the capital Muscat, and approximately 200 kilometres south-east from Dubai in the UAE. The area around Sohar, including Saham and Liwa, has a population of approximately 300,000 and is expanding rapidly, largely due to the very recent establishment of the Sohar Industrial Port Company (SIPC).

With the support of His Majesty Sultan Qaboos bin Said the University has embarked on an expansion of the existing campus. The extended campus will cater to the growing number of students seeking tertiary education. In 2008 Queensland-based Noel Robinson Architects' (NRA) were appointed of to design the new 120 million Australian Dollars Sohar University campus. Buildings include a new Library, Sporting Facilities, Multi-purpose lecture theatres, Graduation Hall, Faculty Buildings for Engineering, Business, Health Sciences, Social Sciences and Humanities, Administration, Student Services and post-graduate residences. NRA has collaborated with the University of Queensland during the design for the campus buildings. The new campus is designed to develop the potential of students to meet the needs of modern industries in the Sultanate.

References

External links
Sohar University website

1998 establishments in Oman
Educational institutions established in 1998
Universities in Oman
Sohar